Rasmussen Global (RG) is an international political consultancy firm, headquartered in Brussels and Copenhagen. The firm was founded by Anders Fogh Rasmussen in 2014 following his term as NATO Secretary General. The company provides strategic advice on issues regarding security policy, transatlantic relations, the European Union, energy, critical raw materials, and space. 

Rasmussen Global is listed as one of the best ranked specialist consultancies in Brussels.

History 

Rasmussen Global was founded in 2014 by the former Danish Prime Minister and NATO Secretary General Anders Fogh Rasmussen.

On 27 May 2016, Rasmussen became a non-staff advisor to President Petro Poroshenko of Ukraine and the firm worked on reform in Ukraine and its global positioning. Rasmussen has also put together a group of friends of Ukraine to help with the reform effort.

in April 2022, Fabrice Pothier became the new CEO of Rasmussen Global. 

In June 2022, Anders Fogh Rasmussen was asked by Ukrainian President Volodymyr Zelenskyy to co-chair an international working group on security guarantees for Ukraine together with Andriy Yermak, the head of the Office of the President of Ukraine.

Current Activities

Rasmussen Global advises both sovereign clients and business clients. They include the government of Japan, Taiwan and Albania and various multinational firms working in energy, critical raw materials, finance, information technology, and space. From June 2022, Rasmussen Global is also working with the Office of the President of Ukraine.

Organization 
The company is headquartered in Copenhagen, Denmark and has offices in Brussels, Berlin, Washington, DC and London. 

Some of its senior advisors include former Estonian President Toomas Hendrik Ilves, American retired diplomat and former NATO Deputy Secretary General Alexander Vershbow, and former Irish digital and Europe Minister Dara Murphy.

In June 2021 former Irish digital and Europe Minister Dara Murphy joined the firm as a Senior Adviser.

References

External links

Privately held companies of Denmark
Consulting firms established in 2014
Political consulting firms